The Karatal-Japyryk Nature Reserve is a nature reserve in Naryn Region of Kyrgyzstan. Established in 1994, it currently covers 36,393 hectares. It was established with a purpose of conservation of unique nature complexes, protection of rare and threatened species of flora and fauna of Central Tien-Shan, and maintain regional environmental balance.

The main section of the nature reserve is situated in the Ak-Talaa and Naryn Districts, south of the lake Song-Köl. It covers the basins of the rivers Karatal and Japyryk, which are tributaries of the Kajyrty (Naryn basin). In 1998 sections of the lakes Song-Köl (3,400 ha land, 5,200 ha water) and Chatyr-Köl (3,200 ha land, 3,954 ha water) were added to the Karatal-Japyryk Nature Reserve.

References
 

Naryn Region
Nature reserves in Kyrgyzstan
Protected areas established in 1994
1994 establishments in Kyrgyzstan